Guillaume-Maurice Guizot (11 January 1833 - 23 November 1892) was a French essayist, translator, professor of literature and civil servant.

Biography
Guillaume was the son of François Guizot and his second wife Élisa Dillon. He was the brother of Henriette Guizot de Witt.

French essayists
Academic staff of the Collège de France
French civil servants
Chevaliers of the Légion d'honneur
Orléanists
French male non-fiction writers
1833 births
1892 deaths
19th-century French translators